Jonathon Williams (born April 16, 1990) is an American basketball player.

Professional career
On July 5, 2014, Williams signed his first professional contract with Itzehoe Eagles of the 1.Regionalliga, the German fourth division.

Williams played for Hamburg Towers in the German second tier ProA in the 2015–16 season, as he averaged 12.7 points and 5.5 rebounds. In 2016, he transferred to Kirchheim Knights. With Kirchheim, Williams was the leading scorer of the 2016–17 ProA season, averaging 18.8 points per game.

On July 3, 2018, Williams signed with New Heroes Den Bosch of the Dutch Basketball League (DBL) and FIBA Europe Cup.

On February 28, 2021, Williams signed with Heroes Den Bosch for a second stint.

References

External links
Wagner Seahawks bio

1990 births
Living people
American expatriate basketball people in Germany
American expatriate basketball people in the Netherlands
American men's basketball players
Basketball players from California
City College of San Francisco Rams men's basketball players
Heroes Den Bosch players
Dutch Basketball League players
Hamburg Towers players
Itzehoe Eagles players
Small forwards
Sportspeople from Richmond, California
VfL Kirchheim Knights players
Wagner Seahawks men's basketball players